Rohit Sagar   versus State of Uttarakhand   (2021) is case where Uttarakhand High Court held that the legal adult have the right to choose their own partners and directed the police to provide necessary protection for the individuals and their property.

Background 
Rohit Sagar and Mohit Goyal, a gay couple living together in Rudrapur, Uttarakhand were threatened by their respective family members. The couple filed a complaint to the Senior Superintendent of Police of Udham Singh Nagar district and the Station House Officer of Police Station No. 2, Rudrapur. The couple filed a writ petition in Uttarakhand High Court when the police failed take necessary action.

Judgement 
The court ruled that persons, who are major, have a fundamental right to choose their own life-partners, despite the opposition voiced by the family members. Therefore, the parents should not be permitted to threaten or to hurt the petitioners. The court directed he Senior Superintendent of Police of Udham Singh Nagar district to immediately provide police protection to both the couple and their properties.

See also 

 LGBT rights in India
 Deepika Singh v. Central Administrative Tribunal (2022)
 Adhila Nasarin v. State Commissioner of Police (2022)
 Navtej Singh Johar v. Union of India (2018)

References 

LGBT rights in India
Indian LGBT rights case law
2021 in India
2021 in LGBT history
High Courts of India cases